Sisakht (SỉSext; also Romanized as Sīsakht and Sī Sakht; also known as Deh Bozorg-e Sīsakht, Deh Bozorg-e Sīsākht, and Deh-e Bozorg Sīsakht) is a city in and the capital of Dena County, Kohgiluyeh and Boyer-Ahmad Province, Iran. At the 2006 census, its population was 6,342, in 1,528 families.

Sisakht is located on the foothills of Zagros Mountains, 34 km from Yasuj, in the northern part of the province. The area of Dana  is  a protected area.

History
Traces of ancient pottery have been found in excavations in Sisakht, as well as graves dating to c. 3000 BC. In Telespid, registered in the Iranian national heritage Organization list, there are traces of Sassanian and Safavid eras.

Climate

References

Gallery

Populated places in Dana County

Cities in Kohgiluyeh and Boyer-Ahmad Province